Richard Greenham (also Grenham) (1535?–1594?) was an English clergyman of Puritan views, well known for his strong Puritan doctrine of the Sabbath. His many sermons and theological treatises had a significant influence on the Puritan movement in England.

Life
He was probably born about 1535, and went at a late age to the University of Cambridge where he matriculated as a sizar of Pembroke Hall on 27 May 1559. He graduated B.A. early in 1564, and was elected Fellow, proceeding M.A. in 1567. His Puritanism was moderate: he had scruples about vestments, and strong views about such abuses as non-residence, but was more concerned for the substance of religion and the co-operation of all religious men within the Church than for theories of ecclesiastical government. His name, 'Richardus Grenham,' is appended with twenty-one others to the letters (3 July and 11 Aug. 1570), asking Lord Burghley, the Chancellor, to reinstate Thomas Cartwright in his office as Lady Margaret's divinity reader. Daniel Neal's statement that at a subsequent period he declared his approbation of Cartwright's 'book of discipline' (1584) is somewhat suspect; but John Strype says he was at one of Cartwright's synods.

On 24 November 1570 he was instituted to the rectory of Dry Drayton, Cambridgeshire. He used to still preach at St Mary's, Cambridge, where he reproved young divines for engaging in controversies, as tantamount to rearing a roof before laying a foundation. In his parish he preached frequently, choosing the earliest hours of the morning for sermon before the work of the day. He devoted Sunday evenings and Thursday mornings to catechizing. He had some divinity pupils, including Henry Smith. During a period of dearth, when barley was ten groats a bushel, he devised a plan for selling corn cheap to the poor, no family being allowed to buy more than three pecks in a week. He cheapened his straw, preached against the public order for lessening the capacity of the bushel, and got into trouble by refusing to let the clerk of the market cut down his measure with the rest. His unworldliness meant that his wife had to borrow money to pay his harvestmen. Richer livings were steadily declined by him. Nevertheless, he was not appreciated by his flock.

He was cited for nonconformity by Richard Cox, bishop of Ely; Cox  asked him whether the guilt of schism lay with conformists or with nonconformists. Greenham answered that, if both parties acted in a spirit of concord, it would lie with neither; otherwise with those who made the rent. Cox gave him no further trouble. His 'Apologie or Aunswere' is in 'A Parte of a Register' (1593), p. 86 sq. On the appearance of the Marprelate tracts (1589) he preached against them at St. Mary's, on the ground that their tendency was 'to make sin ridiculous, whereas it ought to be made odious.'

His friends were anxious to get him to London. He resigned his living about 1591, having held it for about twenty years—he told Warfield, his successor, 'I perceive noe good wrought by my ministerie on any but one familie.' He settled as preacher at Christ Church, Newgate.

In 1592 (if Marsden is right) appeared his 'Treatise of the Sabboth,' of which Thomas Fuller says that 'no book in that age made greater impression on peoples practice.' The second of two sonnets (1599) on Greenham by Joseph Hall, is a tribute; it was the earliest of the Puritan treatises on the observance of the Lord's day, more moderate than the 'Sabbathvm' (1595) of his step-son Nicholas Bownde, who borrowed from Greenham.

Greenham was one of the most famous and well known Elizabethan Puritan ministers of his time, and close friends with other great Puritan divines, such as Laurence Chaderton, Richard Rogers, and William Perkins. Greenham had a significant influence on the rise of English Puritanism through his many sermons and theological treatises.

Death
Samuel Clarke says Greenham died about 1591, in about his sixtieth year, while Fuller says his death was unrecorded, because he died of the plague which raged in 1592. It is mentioned by Waddington that on 2 April 1593 Greenham visited John Penry in the Poultry Compter. Henry Holland implies that he survived the affair of Lopez, February–June 1594.

Works
Greenham's Workes were collected and edited by H.H., i.e. Henry Holland, in 1599; a second edition appeared in the same year; the third edition was 1601, reprinted 1605 and 1612 ('fift and last' edition). 'A Garden of Spiritual Flowers,' by Greenham, was published 1612, and several times reprinted, till 1687. It is doubtful whether Greenham himself published anything, or left anything ready for the press.

Of his 'Treatise of the Sabboth,' which had been circulated privately, Holland found three copies, and edited the best. It was originally a sermon or sermons; and the remaining works (excepting a catechism) are made up from sermon material, with some additions from Greenham's conversation.

Family
He married the widow of Robert Bownde, M.D., physician to the Duke of Norfolk, but had no issue; his step-daughter, Anne Bownde, was the first wife of John Dod.

References

Notes

External links

Attribution

1535 births
1594 deaths
16th-century English writers
16th-century male writers
16th-century English Puritan ministers
English evangelicals
Alumni of Pembroke College, Cambridge
Fellows of Pembroke College, Cambridge
People from Dry Drayton